Tapani is a Finnish surname. Notable people with the surname include:

 Esa Tapani (born 1968), Finnish horn player
 Kevin Tapani (born 1964), American baseball pitcher
 Susanna Tapani (born 1993), Finnish athlete

Finnish-language surnames